WGGA (1240 kHz "The Lake") is a commercial AM radio station broadcasting an adult contemporary radio format. Licensed to Gainesville, Georgia, United States, the station serves the northern section of the Atlanta metropolitan area.  It is currently owned by Jwj Properties, Inc. and features programming from Westwood One.

WGGA is simulcast on an FM translator, W233CO at 94.5 MHz, in Gainesville.

History
WGGA first went signed on in 1941 on 1240 kilocycles.  It was owned by Gainesville Broadcasters, with Henry H. Estes serving as the General Manager.  At first, it was powered at only 250 watts.

AM 550 WCON, owned by The Atlanta Constitution, went off the air in 1953, due to the merger with the Atlanta Journal.  WGGA was awarded the 550 frequency, a position lower on the dial and able to cover much of Northern Georgia.  It was powered at 5,000 watts by day, 500 watts at night.  WDUN took over the 1240 position on the dial in Gainesville that WGGA had vacated.

In 1983, the station again switched frequencies.  WDUN took over the 550 kHz spot on the dial, while WGGA returned to 1240 kHz.  In 1993, the two stations became co-owned, along with 102.9 WDUN-FM.  WGGA switched to a sports format, featuring programming from the ESPN Radio Network.  It called itself "The Ticket."

On April 16, 2018, WGGA after adding an FM translator at 94.5 FM, it changed its format from sports to adult contemporary.

References

External links

GGA
Radio stations established in 1983